Eugene Sims (born March 16, 1986) is a former American football defensive end. He was selected by the Los Angeles Rams in the sixth round of the 2010 NFL draft. He played college football at West Texas A&M University.

Early years
Sims enjoyed a standout prep career at Mize Attendance Center in Mississippi competing in football as well as track and field. He graduated in May 2005.

College career

Jones County Junior College
Sims began his college career at Jones County  Junior College in Ellisville, Mississippi where he recorded 51 tackles, five QB sacks three tackled for losses and one forced fumble as a sophomore. He was rewarded at season's end with an appearance in the MACJC All-Star game. Sims moved to the defensive line in 2006 after being a nine-game starter for the Bobcats at strong safety in 2005.

West Texas A&M
Sims transferred to West Texas A&M where he was recognized as Lone Star Conference Co-Defensive Lineman of the Year in 2008. Sims was the Buffs' starting defensive end in all 13 games and registered 56 tackles (18 solo, 36 assisted) and 13 tackles for losses and 10 sacks and eight hurries and two passes broken up.

As a senior in 2009 Sims was the Buffs' leading tackler among down linemen, recording 56 total tackles (19 solo, 37 assists). He also had a team-high 13.5 tackles for losses, as well as 7.0 sacks, five pass breakups, five quarterback hurries, four blocked kicks, three forced fumbles and one safety. Sims was named Lone Star Conference Defensive Lineman of the Year for a second consecutive season, as well as being a First-team All-LSC South Division selection. Sims also garnered AFCA small college All-America recognition in addition to being named AP Third-team Little All-America.

Professional career

Sims was drafted in the sixth round by the St. Louis Rams. On June 28, 2010, Sims signed a four-year, $1.34 million contract including a $250,000 signing bonus. On September 5, 2010, Sims made the Rams 53-man roster. On September 3, 2013, the Rams signed Sims to a two-year extension through 2015. Sims re-signed with the Rams on a three-year, $10 million contract on March 13, 2016. On March 10, 2017, he was released by the Rams.

References

External links
Los Angeles Rams bio

1986 births
Living people
American football defensive ends
Jones County Bobcats football players
Los Angeles Rams players
St. Louis Rams players
People from Smith County, Mississippi
Players of American football from Mississippi